Miletín is a town in Jičín District in the Hradec Králové Region of the Czech Republic. It has about 900 inhabitants.

History
The first written mention of Miletín is from 1124.

Notable people
Diviš Bořek of Miletínek (?–1438), Hussite military leader
Karel Jaromír Erben (1811–1870), folklorist and writer

Gallery

References

External links

Populated places in Jičín District
Cities and towns in the Czech Republic